The 1958 Manitoba general election was held on June 16, 1958 to elect Members of the Legislative Assembly of the Province of Manitoba, Canada. The election resulted in a minority victory for the Progressive Conservative Party under the leadership of Dufferin Roblin.

This election was the first in Manitoba after a comprehensive electoral redistribution in 1956.  The redistribution saw the city of Winnipeg abandon its three four-member districts. St. Boniface also was broken up into two single-member districts. The old Winnipeg, St. Boniface and two suburban districts were made into 20 single-member constituencies altogether, to give the City of Winnipeg increased representation in the legislature. Elections hereafter used FPTP. 

As well the other districts in the province had dropped the Alternative Voting system and simply used the plurality first past the post system from here on.

Premier Douglas Campbell's Liberal-Progressives lost the majority they had held since 1922. The Progressive Conservative Party under the leadership of Dufferin Roblin won 26 seats, three short of a majority, while the Liberal-Progressives were reduced to second-place status with 19. The social democratic Co-operative Commonwealth Federation (CCF) held the balance of power with 11 seats, and independent Stephen Juba was also elected in Winnipeg.  Both Social Credit and the Labour Progressive Party lost their legislative representation.

After the election, the Liberal-Progressives attempted to form a coalition with the CCF to remain in power.  The CCF rejected this offer, instead giving confidence and supply to a PC government under Roblin and ending 36 years of Progressive and Liberal-Progressive led governments in Manitoba.  Although the Progressive Conservatives had been part of a coalition government with the Liberal-Progressives from 1940 to 1950, this was the first time since 1915 that they had formed an administration on their own. This was the last time the Liberals formed government in Manitoba. This would begin a sharp decline for the Liberals, and a concurrent rise for the CCF. 

Roblin's government proved unstable, and was defeated in the legislature in early 1959.  Manitobans returned to the polls shortly thereafter, and gave the Tories an outright majority while the Liberals were cut down to only 11 seats.

Results

Riding results
Party key:
PC:  Progressive Conservative Party of Manitoba
LP:  Liberal-Progressive Party of Manitoba
CCF:  Manitoba Co-operative Commonwealth Federation
SC:  Manitoba Social Credit Party
LPP:  Labour Progressive Party of Manitoba
Ind:  Independent

(incumbent) denotes incumbent.

Arthur:
John Gordon Cobb (PC) 2072
John Wilfred McRae (LP) 2032
Walter D. Taylor (SC) 693

Assiniboia:
(incumbent)Donovan Swailes (CCF) 2409
George William Johnson (PC) 2278
David McKee Graham (LP) 1165

Birtle-Russell:
(incumbent)Rodney Stewart Clement (LP) 2232
Robert Gordon Smellie (PC) 2102
Eugene Caldwell (CCF) 933

Brandon:
(incumbent)Reginald Otto Lissaman (PC) 4442
Robert Addison Clement (LP) 2818
Hans Fries (CCF) 780

Brokenhead:
Edward Richard Schreyer (CCF) 1474
Fred H. Helwer (LP) 930
Howard Wachal (PC) 729
(incumbent)Stanley Copp (Ind) 641
John William Cross (SC) 203

Burrows:
(incumbent)John Martin Hawryluk (CCF) 2032
(incumbent)William Arthur Kardash (LPP) 1207
Joseph R. Hnidan (LP) 1084
John Kereluk (PC) 1067

Carillon:
(incumbent)Edmond Prefontaine (LP) 2433
Liguori Gauthier (PC) 1047
Henry Mueller (Ind) 608

Churchill:
Edward Joseph Williams (PC) 1580
K. Don Wray (LP) 1283
Frank Mercer (CCF) 370

Dauphin:
Stewart Edgertson McLean (PC) 2740
John Potoski (LP) 1389
A. Clifford Matthews (CCF) 1067

Dufferin:
(incumbent)Walter Clifton McDonald (LP) 1822
William Homer Hamilton (PC) 1749
Ivan Langtry (SC) 545

Elmwood:
Steve Peters (CCF) 2375
(incumbent)Alexander Turk (LP) 1519
Joseph Stepnuk (PC) 1084
Michael Baryluk (Ind C) 689

Emerson:
(incumbent)John Peter Tanchak (LP) 2897
Frank Caspar (PC) 1918
Joseph Lambert (Ind) 200

Ethelbert Plains:
(incumbent)Michael Nicholas Hryhorczuk (LP) 2308
Peter Burtniak (CCF) 1327
Isadore Syrnyk (PC) 835

Fisher:
Peter Wagner (CCF) 1437 
(incumbent)Nicholas Volodymir Bachynsky (LP) 1381 
John O. Olsen (PC) 1140

Flin Flon:
(incumbent)Francis Lawrence Jobin (LP) 1935
Charles Hubert Witney (PC) 1563
J. Conrad  W. Kerr (CCF) 637

Fort Garry:
Sterling Rufus Lyon (PC) 3731
(incumbent)Leslie Raymond Fennell (LP) 2408
Nena Woodward (CCF) 1035

Fort Rouge:
(incumbent)Edwrd Gurney Vaux Evans (PC) 3647
James Edward Wilson (LP) 1862
Ernest Richard Draffin (CCF) 1143

Gimli:
George Johnson (PC) 1988
(incumbent)Steinn Olafur Thompson (LP) 1374
Sigurdur Wopnford (CCF) 954

Gladstone:
Nelson Shoemaker (LP) 2570
Clayton Gault (PC) 1677
Melvin Batters (CCF) 455

Hamiota:
Barry Peill Strickland (PC) 2261
William T. Wherrett (LP) 1859
Arthur Nicholson (CCF) 416

Inkster:
(incumbent)Morris Gray (CCF) 3083
Peter Okrainec (PC) 1584
Peter Stanley Taraska (LP) 1516

Kildonan:
Anthony John Reid (CCF) 2776
John Ernest Willis (PC) 2665
George Nordland Suttie (LP) 1808

Lac Du Bonnet:
Arthur A. Trapp (LP) 1526
Glen A. Stewart (PC) 1350
Harry Olensky (CCF) 569
Lawrence P Schlamp (SC) 299

Lakeside:
(incumbent)Douglas Campbell (LP) 2119
John F. Bate (PC) 1582

La Verendrye:
Stanley Carl Roberts (LP) 1565
Stan Bisson (PC) 1395

Logan:
(incumbent)Stephen Juba (Ind) 2234
Art Coulter (CCF) 1669

Minnedosa:
(incumbent)Charles Lemington Shuttleworth (LP) 2117
Sidney Paler (PC) 1983
(incumbent)Gilbert Alexander Hutton (SC) 634
William A. Yuel (CCF) 443

Morris:
(incumbent)Harold Proctor Shewman (PC) 1762
Bruce McKenzie (LP) 1014
August Recksiedler (SC) 370

Osborne:
(incumbent)Lloyd Cleworth Stinson (CCF) 3215
John Howorth (PC) 2813
Keith N. Routley (LP) 1654

Pembina:
(incumbent)Maurice Evans Ridley (PC) 2683
Kenneth C Hartwell (LP) 1510

Portage la Prairie:
(incumbent)Charles Edwin Greenlay (LP) 1978
Robert Ernest Burke (PC) 1528
Albert R. Barrett (CCF) 541

Radisson:
(incumbent)Andrew Russell Paulley (CCF) 3504
Bernard Rodolph Wolfe (LP) 2334
Harold Huppe (PC) 2116

Rhineland:
(incumbent)William Conrad Miller (LP) 1687
Oscar Martel (PC) 854
Abe Enns (SC) 758

River Heights:
William Blakeman Scarth (PC) 3945
William John McKeag (LP) 2884
Andrew Moore (Ind) 803

Roblin:
Arnold Keith Alexander (PC) 1884
(incumbent)Raymond Mitchell (LP) 1686 
Monty A. Miller (CCF) 1031

Rock Lake:
(incumbent)Abram William Harrison (PC) 2465
Walter Ernest Clark (LP) 2227

Rockwood-Iberville:
(incumbent)Robert William Bend (LP) 2450 
George Henry Wilson Huttonn (PC) 1731
Samuel Cranston (CCF) 434

Rupertsland:
Joseph Ernest Jeannotte (PC) 2342
(incumbent)Francis Roy Brown (LP) 511
Asta Oddson (Ind) 364

St. Boniface:
(incumbent)Roger Joseph Teillet (LP) 3178
Harry DeLeeuw (PC) 2616
Ben Cyr (CCF) 1256

St. George:
(incumbent)Elman Keisler Guttormson (LP) 2144
Dan McFayden (PC) 970
Douglas S. Stefanson (CCF) 593
Mahlin J.G. Magunsson (Ind Con) 274

St. James:
Douglas Moncreiff Stanes (PC) 2646
(incumbent)Reginald Frederick Wightman (LP) 2170
Alvin H. Mackling (CCF) 2136

St. Johns:
David Orlikow (CCF) 2495
Stan Carrick (PC) 1295
Jaroslaw Rebchuk (LP) 922

St. Matthews:
William George Martin (PC) 2848
Gordon Richard Fines (CCF) 2026
Anne Ethel Murphy (LP) 1854
(incumbent)Henry Baird Scott (IC) 260
George Albert Frith (Ind) 149

St. Vital:
Frederick Groves (PC) 3616
William R. Appleby (LP) 2331
Leslie C. Foden (CCF) 1334
Percy B. Hayward (Ind) 242

Ste. Rose:
(incumbent)Gildas Laurent Molgat (LP) 2400
Alvin Getz (PC) 1010
Alphonse J. Bouchard (SC) 415
Leon W. Hoefer (CCF) 354

Selkirk:
(incumbent)Thomas Paterson Hillhouse (LP) 1850
David B. Veitch (PC) 1493
Frank Kuzemski (CCF) 591
Fred L. Luining (SC) 173

Seven Oaks:
Arthur Edgar Wright (CCF) 3641
Maurice Gutnik (PC) 1541
Cecil Joseph Henry Lyon (LP) 1449

Souris-Lansdowne:
Malcolm Earl McKellar (PC) 2256
David Lloyd Barclay (LP) 1549
Alex Shiloff (CCF) 95

Springfield:
(incumbent)William Lucko (LP) 1351
Oscar Russell (PC) 1269
Ed Kanarowski (CCF) 875
William G. Storsley (SC) 283

Swan River:
Albert Harold C. Corbett (PC) 1421
Hilliard Farriss (CCF) 1316
(incumbent)Ronald Douglas Robertson (LP) 1083
Aldric S. Helps (SC) 285

The Pas:
John Benson Carroll (PC) 2325
William E. Cudmore (LP) 898
Howard Russell Pawley (CCF) 801

Turtle Mountain:
(incumbent)Errick French Willis (PC) 2949 
Edward Ingo Dow (LP) 1880
Clarence A. Ferguson (SC) 316

Virden:
(incumbent)John William McLeod Thompson (PC) 2935
(incumbent)Francis Campbell Bell (LP) 1662

Wellington:
Richard Harry Seaborn (PC) 2532
James R. McIsaac (CCF) 2385
(incumbent)Jack St. John (LP) 1958

Winnipeg Centre:
James Cowan (PC) 3462
Paul W. Goodman (LP) 1623
David Adrian Mulligan (CCF) 1141

Wolseley:
(incumbent)Dufferin Roblin (PC) 3959
John Gurzon Harvey (LP) 1739
Allen Denton (CCF) 1202

See also
List of Manitoba political parties

References

1958
1958 elections in Canada
1958 in Manitoba
June 1958 events in Canada